Natalia Sadowska (born 27 July 1991) is a Polish draughts player who ranked third at the Women's Draughts European Championship in 2010 and whose successes go back to 2007. She is a highly rated women's player for Poland and was second at the 2015 Women's World Draughts Championship in Wuhan. In 2016 won title women's world draughts champion in the match with Olga Kamyshleeva. In 2018 won title women's world draughts champion in the match with Zoja Golubeva.

In 2016 she was second at the first women's world championship of Turkish draughts.

International grandmaster (GMIF). She is a student at the National Defence University of Warsaw.

World Championship
 2011 (10 place)
 2013 (8 place)
 2015 (2 place)
 2016 (2 place in turkish draughts)
 2016 (won title in match)
 2017 (4 place)
 2018 (won title in match)
 2019 (5 place)
 2021 (lose in match)
 2021 (4 place)

European Championship
 2010 (3 place)
 2012 (9 place)
 2014 (9 place)
 2016 (10 place)
 2018 (8 place)
 2022 (1 place)

Poland Championship (women)
 2006 (2 place)
 2009 (1 place)
 2010 (2 place)
 2011 (2 place)
 2012 (2 place)
 2013 (1 place)
 2014 (1 place)
 2015 (1 place)
 2018 (3 place)
 2020 (2 place)

Poland Championship (men)
 2013 (6 place)
 2014 (5 place)
 2015 (3 place)
 2017 (2 place)
 2018 (1 place)
 2019 (1 place)
 2020 (2 place)

References

External links
 
 Women's Championship of Poland 2020

Living people
Polish draughts players
Players of international draughts
Place of birth missing (living people)
1991 births